Pediasia aridella is a species of moth of the family Crambidae. It was described by Carl Peter Thunberg in 1788 and is found in Europe. There are three recognised subspecies.

The wingspan is 20–26 mm. The forewings are ochreous, veins variably pale or whitish, interneural spaces sometimes blackish-sprinkled; a blackish streak beneath median vein from base to middle; lines obscurely darker, on lower half blackish mixed, median very strongly curved, very oblique dorsally, second curved, slightly indented below middle; three or four black dots on lower half of termen; cilia ochreous, mixed with white. Hindwings are whitish-grey or very pale grey. The larva is pale ochreous-grey; dorsal line darker; spots light brownish; head light or dark brown, darker-marked; plate of 2 sometimes dark brown.

The moth flies from June to September depending on the location.

The larvae feed on various grasses.

Subspecies
Pediasia aridella aridella
Pediasia aridella caradjaellus (Rebel, 1907)
Pediasia aridella edmontellus (McDunnough, 1923)

References

External links

 Waarneming.nl  
 Pediasia aridella at UKMoths

Crambini
Moths described in 1788
Moths of Europe